Camille St. Cyr (born January 25, 1975) is an American television and film casting director.

Casting director credits
The Young and the Restless (October 7, 2008–present; hired by Paul Rauch)
Blue Blood (TV Movie, 2008)
NCIS (TV series, 2003–2007)
Drive (TV series, 2007)
The Dresden Files (TV series, 2007)Fort Pit (TV movie, 2007)The Half Life of Timofey Berezin (TV movie, 2006)A Little Thing Called Murder (TV movie, 2006)JAG (TV series, 2003–2005)PU-239 (Movie, 2005)Mermaid (TV movie, 2005)

Casting department/associate creditsVegas Dick (TV movie, 2003)Vampire: Los Muertos (Movie, 2002)Dead Above Ground (Movie, 2002)Providence (TV series, 2001–2002)Max Keeble's Big Move (Movie, 2001)Strong Medicine (TV series, 2000)The X-Files (TV series, 1998)Sabrina the Teenage Witch (TV series, 1998)Port Charles (TV series, 1997–1998)General Hospital'' (TV series, 1997–1998) (hired by Wendy Riche)

External links

1969 births
Living people
American film producers